Dinnerware Artspace is a non-profit art space located in Tucson, Arizona, United States. Not only is it an art exhibition space, but it also provides full range of artist services.

In 1979, before Tucson had an arts district, Dinnerware established an artist presence on Congress Street.  Today, it continues to be the cornerstone of the contemporary art scene in downtown Tucson.  Dinnerware exhibits work from first-time, emerging, and established area artists. Dinnerware Artspace is currently located at 119 E. Toole in Tucson, Arizona, and has grown into a community art center. Included is the Central Arts Gallery (an artist run art collective), Dinnerware Press(a printmaking collective), YOGAnomics (a yoga collective), Dinnerware Photo (photo darkroom collective), Jewelry, Ceramics, Fashion, Framing, and provides assistance for artists wanting to sell online at Etsy.com. Dinnerware provides classes, workshops, lectures, and events in these areas as well. Annual exhibits include Salon des Refuse, Night of 1,000 Drawings, Pollos del Pueblo and a number of theme group exhibits. Events include semi annual fashion shows, IGNITE Tucson, and Snakebite Film Festival with more always in the planning stages. Dinnerware relies on support from public participation of its projects and draws large audiences to its various exhibitions and innovative events.

External links
Dinnerware Artspace

1979 establishments in Arizona
Culture of Tucson, Arizona
Art museums and galleries in Arizona
Tourist attractions in Tucson, Arizona
Art galleries established in 1979